Tal Sondak (born July 23, 1976) is an Israeli singer.

His musical career started at the age of ten as a member of a boys choir. He received several first prizes at children's song festivals, most recently as a 15-year-old, where he won with a song that he had written himself.

He has represented Israel at several music festivals and sung for the Jewish community in Denmark, the USA, Switzerland and Canada. He has been a frequent guest on TV programs and in several musical projects in Israel.

In 2001, Sondak represented Israel in the Eurovision Song Contest with the song "En Davar" and reached 16th place with a total of 25 points.

Personal life 
He is married and has two daughters.

References

External links
 Official website

Living people
21st-century Israeli male singers
Eurovision Song Contest entrants for Israel
1976 births
Eurovision Song Contest entrants of 2001